Dannette Louise Young-Stone (born October 6, 1964, in Jacksonville, Florida) is a former American track and field athlete. She won a gold medal at the 1988 Summer Olympics in Seoul as a member of the 4 × 100 metres relay team.  Four years later at the 1992 Summer Olympics, in Barcelona, she won a silver medal in the 4 × 400 meters relay. She is an alumnus of Alabama A&M University, where she won the Division II track title in the 100 and 200 meters three straight years, as well as running anchor on the  4 × 100 meters relay team at Alabama A&M.

References
Alabama A&M sports history: Track's Dannette Young-Stone, from al.com; retrieved 2012-10-27.
 ; retrieved 2010-10-26.
 USA Track & Field – Dannette Young-Stone track and field personal bests, from www.usatf.org; retrieved 2010-10-26.

1964 births
Athletes (track and field) at the 1988 Summer Olympics
Athletes (track and field) at the 1992 Summer Olympics
Athletes (track and field) at the 1996 Summer Olympics
Olympic gold medalists for the United States in track and field
Olympic silver medalists for the United States in track and field
Sportspeople from Jacksonville, Florida
Living people
American female sprinters
Medalists at the 1992 Summer Olympics
Medalists at the 1988 Summer Olympics
Universiade medalists in athletics (track and field)
Goodwill Games medalists in athletics
Universiade bronze medalists for the United States
Medalists at the 1987 Summer Universiade
Competitors at the 1990 Goodwill Games
Competitors at the 1994 Goodwill Games
Olympic female sprinters
21st-century American women